The Taipei Metro Nangang Software Park station is located in the Nangang District in Taipei, Taiwan. It is a station on the Brown Line.

Station overview

This two-level, elevated station features two side platforms, two exits, and a platform elevator located on the north side of the concourse level. The station is 93 meters long and 53 meters wide, while the platform is 93 meters long and 21.5 meters wide.

As part of the public art project for Brown Line, the theme for this station is "Digital".

History
Construction of the Nangang Software Park station began on 16 June 2003 and completed on 22 February 2009, before full opening on 4 July 2009. This station is named after the Nankang Software Park in its vicinity.

Station layout

References

Wenhu line stations
Railway stations opened in 2009